Mesostigmodera is a fossil genus of beetles in the family Buprestidae, containing the following species:

 Mesostigmodera frenguelli Martins-Neto & Gallego, 1999
 Mesostigmodera typica Etheridge & Olliff, 1890

References

Buprestidae genera
Prehistoric beetle genera